The 24th Toronto International Film Festival ran from September 9 to September 18, 1999. The festival opened with Atom Egoyan's Felicia's Journey and closed with Onegin by Martha Fiennes. A total of 318 films were screened in the 13 programmes.

Awards

Programmes

Gala Opening Night
 Felicia's Journey by Atom Egoyan

Gala Closing Night
 Onegin by Martha Fiennes

Gala Presentations
 American Beauty by Sam Mendes
 Anywhere But Here by Wayne Wang
 The Cider House Rules by Lasse Hallstrom
 Est-ouest by Regis Wargnier
 Jakob the Liar by Peter Kassovitz
 Love in the Mirror (Amor nello specchio) by Salvatore Maira
 Me Myself I by Pip Karmel
 Mumford by Lawrence Kasdan
 Music of the Heart by Wes Craven
 La niña de tus ojos by Fernando Trueba
 Orfeu by Carlos Diegues
 Ride with the Devil by Ang Lee
 Simpatico by Matthew Warchus
 Snow Falling on Cedars by Scott Hicks
 Sunshine by István Szabó
 Sweet and Lowdown by Woody Allen

Special Presentations
 Children of the Century by Diane Kurys
 All the Rage by James D. Stern
 Annaluise & Anton by Caroline Link
 The Best Man by Malcolm D. Lee
 The Big Kahuna by John Swanbeck
 Black and White by James Toback
 Breakfast of Champions by Alan Rudolph
 Dogma by Kevin Smith
 Forever Mine by Paul Schrader
 Ghost Dog: The Way of the Samurai by Jim Jarmusch
 Grass by Ron Mann
 Gregory's Two Girls by Bill Forsyth
 History is Made at Night by Ilkka Jarvilaturi
 The Hurricane by Norman Jewison
 Joe the King by Frank Whaley
 Une liaison pornographique by Frederic Fonteyne
 The Limey by Steven Soderbergh
 The Luck of Ginger Coffey by Irvin Kershner
 Mansfield Park by Patricia Rozema
 A Map of the World by Scott Elliott
 Mr. Death: The Rise and Fall of Fred A. Leuchter, Jr. by Errol Morris
 Pas de scandale by Benoît Jacquot
 Princess Mononoke by Hayao Miyazaki
 The Third Miracle by Agnieszka Holland
 To Walk with Lions by Carl Schultz
 Tumbleweeds by Gavin O'Connor
 Wayward Son by Randall Harris
 Women Talking Dirty by Coky Giedroyc
 Wonderland by Michael Winterbottom

Masters
 8½ Women by Peter Greenaway
 L'Autre by Youssef Chahine
 The Emperor and the Assassin by Chen Kaige
 Goya in Bordeaux by Carlos Saura
 Juha by Aki Kaurismäki
 Kikujiro by Takeshi Kitano
 The Legend of 1900 by Giuseppe Tornatore
 La lettre by Manoel de Oliveira
 Moloch by Alexandr Sokurov
 Molokai: The Story of Father Damien by Paul Cox
 No One Writes to the Colonel by Arturo Ripstein
 The Wet-Nurse by Marco Bellocchio
 The Wind Will Carry Us by Abbas Kiarostami

Perspective Canada
 Babette's Feet by Harry Killas
 Below the Belt by Laurie Colbert and Dominique Cardona
 The Big Snake of the World (Le Grand serpent du monde) by Yves Dion
 By This Parting by Mieko Ouchi
 La Casa del Nonno by Lisa Sfriso
 Discharge (Décharge) by Patrick Demers
 Don't Think Twice by Sarah Polley
 Dreamtrips by Kal Ng
 Ecstasy by Mark Wihak
 Eva Meets Felix by Heidi B. Gerber
 Exhuming Tyler by Merlin Dervisevic
 Fit by David Christensen
 The Five Senses by Jeremy Podeswa
 Fly by Jigar Talati
 Four Days by Curtis Wehrfritz
 Fries with That by Christopher McKay
 Frog Pond by Bradley Walsh
 Full Blast by Rodrigue Jean
 A Girl is a Girl by Reginald Harkema
 Here am I by Joshua Dorsey and Douglas Naimer
 Hi, I'm Steve by Robert Kennedy
 Je te salue by Hugo Brochu
 Johnny by Carl Bessai
 Just Watch Me: Trudeau and the 70's Generation by Catherine Annau
 Karaoke by Stéphane Lafleur
 Kokoro is for Heart by Philip Hoffman
 The Life Before This by Jerry Ciccoritti
 The Long Winter (Quand je serai parti... vous vivrez encore) by Michel Brault
 Memories Unlocked (Souvenirs intimes) by Jean Beaudin
 Mothers of Me by Alexandra Grimanis
 My Father's Angel by Davor Marjanovic
 My Father's Hands by David Sutherland
 New Waterford Girl by Allan Moyle
 The Offering by Paul Lee
 Pamplemousse by Tink
 Quiver by Scott Beveridge
 Remembrance Dance by Chris Gilpin
 Rollercoaster by Scott Smith
 Sea Song by Richard Reeves
 Second Date by James Genn
 Set Me Free (Emporte-moi) by Léa Pool
 So Beautiful by Jacob Wren
 Soul Cages by Phillip Barker
 Sparklehorse by Gariné Torossian
 Subterranean Passage by Michael Crochetière
 Switch by Hope Thompson
 Top of the Food Chain by John Paizs
 Tops & Bottoms: Sex, Power and Sadomasochism by Cristine Richey
 Touched by Mort Ransen
 Toy Soldiers by Jackie May
 Tuba Girl by Michèle Muzzi
 Undertow by Sarah Bachinski
 Wedding Knives by Johanna Mercer
 When the Day Breaks by Wendy Tilby and Amanda Forbis
 Where Lies the Homo? by Jean-François Monette
 Zyklon Portrait by Elida Schogt

Contemporary World Cinema
 1999 Madeleine by Laurent Bouhnik
 Adrenaline Drive by Shinobu Yaguchi
 After the Truth by Roland Suso Richter
 Criminal Lovers by François Ozon
 Andares in Time of War by Alejandra Jimenez Lopez
 The Annihilation of Fish by Charles Burnett
 Augustin, roi du Kung-fu by Anne Fontaine
 Away with Words by Christopher Doyle
 Beau travail by Claire Denis
 Beautiful People by Jasmin Dizdar
 The Big Brass Ring by George Hickenlooper
 Le bleu des villes by Stephane Brize
 Boys Don't Cry by Kimberly Peirce
 Buddy Boy by Mark Hanlon
 Bullets Over Summer by Wilson Yip
 Burlesk King by Mel Chionglo
 C'est quoi la vie? by François Dupeyron
 Caravan by Eric Valli
 The Color of Heaven by Majid Majidi
 Les convoyeurs attendent by Benoit Mariage
 Crane World by Pablo Trapero
 The Cup by Khyentse Norbu
 Dancing with Hydra by Takuji Suzuki
 Darkness and Light by Chang Tso-chi
 Un derangement considerable by Bernard Stora
 Deterrence by Rod Lurie
 East is East by Damien O'Donnell
 Enthusiasm by Ricardo Larrain
 Feeling Sexy by Davida Allen
 From the Edge of the City by Constantinos Giannaris
 Garage Olimpo by Marco Bechis
 Gemini by Shinya Tsukamoto
 Guinevere by Audrey Wells
 Hans Warns – My 20th Century by Gordian Maugg
 Happy, Texas by Mark Illsley
 Harem Suare by Ferzan Özpetek
 High Expectations by Evi Quaid
 L'humanite by Bruno Dumont
 Jesus' Son by Alison Maclean
 Journey to the Sun by Yeşim Ustaoğlu
 Judy Berlin by Eric Mendelsohn
 julien donkey-boy by Harmony Korine
 Kadosh by Amos Gitaï
 The Last September by Deborah Warner
 Lies by Jang Sun-woo
 Luna Papa by Bakhityar Khudojnazarov
 M/Other by Nobuhiro Suwa
 Malli by Santosh Sivan
 The Man-Eater by Aurelio Grimaldi
 March of Happiness by Lin Cheng-Sheng
 Mifune – Dogme 3 by Søren Kragh-Jacobsen
 Miss Julie by Mike Figgis
  by Fred Kelemen
 One Piece! by Shinobu Yaguchi and Takuji Suzuki
 Peau neuve by Emilie Deleuze
 The Personals by Chen Kuo-fu
 Le petit voleur by Eric Zonca
 Ratcatcher by Lynne Ramsay
 Revenge by Andrés Wood
 Rien a faire by Marion Vernoux
 Romance by Catherine Breillat
 A Room for Romeo Brass by Shane Meadows
 Rosetta by Luc Dardenne and Jean-Pierre Dardenne
 Show Me Love by Lukas Moodysson
 Shower by Zhang Yang
 Simon, The Magician by Ildiko Enyedi
 So Close to Paradise by Wang Xiaoshuai
 Soft Hearts by Joel Lamangan and Eric Quizon
 Speedy Boys by James Herbert
 Splendor by Gregg Araki
 Split Wide Open by Dev Benegal
 Sunburn by Nelson Hume
 Tempting Heart by Sylvia Chang
 Throne of Death by Murali Nair
 Time Out by Sergio Cabrera
 A Time to Love by Giacomo Campiotti
 Two Streams by Carlos Reichenbach
 Urban Feel by Jonathan Sagall
 The Virgin by Diego Donnhofer
 The War Zone by Tim Roth
 Yesterday Children by Carlos Siguion-Reyna

Discovery
 30 Days by Aaron Harnick
 Bloody Angels by Karin Julsrud
 But Forever in My Mind by Gabriele Muccino
 But I'm a Cheerleader by Jamie Babbit
 Civilisees by Randa Chahal
 The Criminal of Barrio Concepcion by Lav Diaz
 Envy by Julie Money
 Freak Weather by Mary Kuryla
 Girls' Night Out by Im Sang-soo
 A Glass of Rage by Aluízio Abranches
 Goat on Fire and Smiling Fish by Kevin Jordan
 Guts by Ron Termaat
 Hidden River by Mercedes García Guevara
 Human Traffic by Justin Kerrigan
 I Could Read the Sky by Nichola Bruce
 Idle Running by Janez Burger
 Janice Beard: 45 WPM by Clare Kilner
 The Joys of Smoking by Nick Katsapetses
 The Junction by Urszula Urbaniak
 Just One Time by Lane Janger
 Kill by Inches by Diane Doniol-Valcroze and Arthur Flam
 Moonlight Whispers by Akihiko Shiota
 Mr. I and Mrs. O by Valentina Leduc
 Northern Skirts by Barbara Albert
 Pictures and Butterfly by Yanko Del Pino
 Return of the Idiot by Saša Gedeon
 Rodents by Sebastián Cordero
 Shadows in the Dark by Pankaj Butalia
 Spring Forward by Tom Gilroy
 This Year's Love by David Kane
 Under California – The Limit of Time by Carlos Bolado
 The Wall by Sergio Arau
 Wheels by Djordje Milosavljevic
 Yana's Friends by Arik Kaplun

Planet Africa
 After the Rain by Ross Kettle
 Chef! by Jean-Marie Teno
 Compensation by Zeinabu irene Davis
 Cry Me a Baby by Tamsin MacCarthy
 La genèse by Cheick Oumar Sissoko
 Harlem Aria by William Jennings
 Hot-Irons by Andrew Dosunmu
 Living with Pride: Ruth Ellis @ 100 by Yvonne Welbon
 Love and Action In Chicago by Dwayne Johnson-Cochran
 Olivia's Story by Charles Burnett
 La petite vendeuse de soleil by Djibril Diop Mambety
 Portrait of a Young Man Drowning by Teboho Mahlatsi
 Rage by Newton I. Aduaka
 Rituals by Carol Mayes
 Third World Cop by Chris Browne

Real to Reel
 American Movie by Chris Smith
 Barenaked in America by Jason Priestley
 Berlin-Cinema (Titre Provisoire) by Samira Gloor-Fadel
 Bread Day by Sergei Dvortsevoy
 Coven by Mark Borchardt
 Crazy English by Zhang Yuan
 Highway by Sergei Dvortsevoy
 Homo Sapiens 1900 by Peter Cohen
 The Humiliated by Jesper Jargil
 If You Only Understood by Rolando Diaz
 Jam Session by Makoto Shinozaki
 The Jaundiced Eye by Nonny de la Pena
 Juan, I Forgot I Don't Remember by Juan Carlos Rulfo
 The Making of a New Empire by Jos de Putter
 Me & Isaac Newton by Michael Apted
 My Best Fiend by Werner Herzog
 Negative Space by Chris Petit
 Pripyat by Nikolaus Geyrhalter
 Shadow Boxers by Katya Bankowsky
 The Specialist by Eyal Sivan
 Sud by Chantal Akerman
 Three by Issac Julien
 Work and Progress by Vivian Ostrovsky and Yann Beauvais

Dialogues: Talking with Pictures
 The Awful Truth by Leo McCarey
 Elephant by Alan Clarke
 Hiroshima 28 by Patrick Lung Kong
 Persona by Ingmar Bergman
 Shadows by John Cassavetes
 The Tales of Hoffmann by Michael Powell and Emeric Pressburger
 Why Does Herr R. Run Amok? by Rainer Werner Fassbinder and Michael Fengler
 Yojimbo by Akira Kurosawa

Indiscreet Charms: New Spanish Cinema
 Solas by Benito Zambrano
 Beloved/Friend by Ventura Pons
 Between Your Legs by Manuel Gomez Pereira
 Do You Really Wanna Know? by Jurdao Faemino, Blanco Faemino, Javier Jurdao and Pedro Blanco
 Dying of Laughter by Álex de la Iglesia
 Fading Memories by Enrique Gabriel
 Flesh by Begona Vicario
 Flowers from Another World by Icíar Bollaín
 Frivolinas by Arturo Carballo
 Golden Whore by Miquel Crespi
 Havana Quartet by Fernando Colomo
 Jealousy by Vicente Aranda
 Lisbon by Antonio Hernández
 The Mole and the Fairy by Grojo
 Rapture by Iván Zulueta
 Roulette by Roberto Santiago
 Washington Wolves by Mariano Barroso

Spotlight: Kiyoshi Kurosawa
 Barren Illusion by Kiyoshi Kurosawa
 Charisma by Kiyoshi Kurosawa
 Cure by Kiyoshi Kurosawa
 The Excitement of the Do-Re-Mi-Fa Girl by Kiyoshi Kurosawa
 Eyes of the Spider by Kiyoshi Kurosawa
 License to Live by Kiyoshi Kurosawa
 Serpent's Path by Kiyoshi Kurosawa

Tribute: The Story of David Overbey
 A Better Tomorrow by John Woo
 Beyond Gravity by Garth Maxwell
 Carne by Gaspar Noé
 Distant Voices, Still Lives by Terence Davies
 Dust in the Wind by Hou Hsiao-hsien
 Insiang by Lino Brocka
 Killer of Sheep by Charles Burnett
 Tragedy of an Indian Farmer by Murali Nair

Midnight Madness
 Born to Lose: The Last Rock and Roll Movie by Lech Kowalski
 Fever by Alex Winter
 Freeway II: Confessions of a Trickbaby by Matthew Bright
 Gamera 3: Revenge of Iris by Shusuke Kaneko
 George Lucas in Love by Joe Nussbaum
 The Item by Dan Clark
 Komodo by Michael Lantieri
 Possessed by Anders Rønnow Klarlund
 Wadd: The Life and Times of John C. Holmes by Cass Paley
 The Wisdom of Crocodiles by Po Chih Leong

References

External links
 Official site
 1999 Toronto International Film Festival at IMDb

1999 film festivals
1999
1999 in Toronto
1999 in Canadian cinema
1999 festivals in North America